Cleburne Regional Airport  is a city-owned, public-use airport located two nautical miles (4 km) northwest of the central business district of Cleburne, a city in Johnson County, Texas, United States. Formerly known as Cleburne Municipal Airport, it is included in the National Plan of Integrated Airport Systems for 2011–2015, which categorized it as a general aviation facility.

Although most U.S. airports use the same three-letter location identifier for the FAA and IATA, this airport is assigned CPT by the FAA but has no designation from the IATA (which assigned CPT to Cape Town International Airport in South Africa).

Facilities and aircraft 
Cleburne Regional Airport covers an area of 520 acres (210 ha) at an elevation of 854 feet (260 m) above mean sea level. It has one runway designated 15/33 with an asphalt surface measuring 5,697 by 100 feet (1,736 x 30 m).

For the 12-month period ending February 5, 2009, the airport had 33,000 general aviation aircraft operations, an average of 90 per day. At that time there were 95 aircraft based at this airport: 87% single-engine, 10% multi-engine, 2% jet, and 1% helicopter.

References

External links 
 Airport page at City of Cleburne website
  at Texas DOT Airport Directory
 Aerial image as of January 1995 from USGS The National Map
 

Airports in Texas
Buildings and structures in Cleburne, Texas
Buildings and structures in Johnson County, Texas
Transportation in Johnson County, Texas